Himan is the name of several towns:

Heyman, Iran
Himan-New Cush, South Sudan